John Fremont Burnham was a member of the Wisconsin State Assembly.

Biography
Burnham was born on June 
23, 1856 in Milwaukee, Wisconsin. He attended the University of Notre Dame.

Career
Burnham was elected to the Assembly in 1896. Previously, he was Sheriff of Waukesha County, Wisconsin from 1889 to 1890. He had been an unsuccessful candidate for the Assembly in 1884. Burnham was a Republican.

References

Politicians from Milwaukee
People from Waukesha County, Wisconsin
Republican Party members of the Wisconsin State Assembly
Wisconsin sheriffs
University of Notre Dame alumni
1856 births
Year of death missing